The team sport of Cricket became a medal sport at the 2010 Asian Games. The last time cricket featured in a major multi-sport event was at the 1998 Commonwealth Games held in Kuala Lumpur, Malaysia. The gold medal was won on that occasion by South Africa, who defeated Australia by 4 wickets in the final with New Zealand winning the bronze medal. At a general meeting of the Olympic Council of Asia, held in Kuwait on 17 April 2007, it was announced that cricket would be included as a medal sport in the 2010 Asian Games to be held in Guangzhou. Matches would be played on a Twenty20, 20-overs per side format.

Following the announcement, Asian Cricket Council Chief Executive Syed Ashraful Huq said "Cricket will receive a major boost across Asia and in particular China, as a result of this enlightened decision. The Asian Cricket Council pledges its support to the Guangzhou games organizers in order to make the event a success."

Asian cricketing powerhouses India and Pakistan have been the drivers behind the inclusion of cricket in the Asian Games. The Test status nations in the Asian Cricket Council, Bangladesh, India, Pakistan and Sri Lanka would compete with the initial plan that the Associate teams such as Nepal would also be invited to play in the inaugural competition. China will compete as the host nation which serves as a boost for the Chinese Cricket Association which has boldly stated its ambition of China becoming a force in one-day cricket by the 2019 World Cup.

The plans for including Associate/Affiliate nations in the Asian Games was later changed, along with the format that the competition would take place in, changing from 50 over matches to Twenty20 matches. It was decided that the 2009 ACC Twenty20 Cup would serve as the pre-tournament qualifying competition. Afghanistan qualified as winners of the tournament along with the national teams of Oman and the United Arab Emirates.

Cricket was not held in 2018 Asian Games but in 2019, during Olympic Council of Asia's General Assembly it was decided the return of the sport in the 2022 Asian Games, which will be held in Hangzhou, China.

Summary

Men

Women

Medal table

Participating nations
Legend
QF — Quarterfinals
R1 — Group round / First round

Men

Women

List of medalists

References

External links
Asian Cricket Council (ACC)

 
Sports at the Asian Games
Asian Games
Asian Games